Ronald McCrae Rutherford (15 June 1906 – 2 October 1986) was a former Australian rules footballer who played with Melbourne in the Victorian Football League (VFL).

Notes

External links 

1906 births
Australian rules footballers from Victoria (Australia)
Melbourne Football Club players
Old Melburnians Football Club players
1986 deaths